Sam Grey is a British actress.

Sam Grey  may also refer to:

Sam Grey (All My Children), a fictional character in the U.S. TV soap opera All My Children
 Sam Grey, a fictional character of the 1939 film, Star Reporter, portrayed by Eddie Kane

See also
Samuel Gray (disambiguation)
Sam Gray (disambiguation)